Frederick Gunn may refer to:

Frederick William Gunn, abolitionist who founded The Gunnery and America's first summer camp
Frederick C. Gunn, architect in the United States